Setacera is a genus of shore flies in the family Ephydridae.

Species

S. aldrichi Cresson, 1935
S. atrovirens (Loew, 1862)
S. aurata (Stenhammar, 1844)
S. breviventris (Loew, 1860)
S. durani Cresson, 1935
S. freidbergi Mathis, 1982
S. jamesi Mathis, 1982
S. micans (Haliday, 1833)
S. multicolor (Giordani Soika, 1956)
S. needhami Johannsen, 1935
S. pacifica (Cresson, 1925)
S. pilicornis Coquillett, 1902
S. trichoscelis Mathis, 1982
S. trina Collin, 1963
S. viridis Miyagi, 1966

References

Ephydridae
Brachycera genera
Diptera of North America
Diptera of Europe
Diptera of Africa
Diptera of Asia
Taxa named by Ezra Townsend Cresson